Henry Griffin was an Irish churchman.

Henry Griffin may also refer to:

List of The O.C. characters#Henry Griffin
Henry Lepel-Griffin
Henry Griffin, character in Unnatural History (TV series)
Henry L. Griffin

See also
Harry Griffin (disambiguation)
Henry Griffith (disambiguation)